Burdi may refer to:
 Buledi, or Burdi, a Baloch tribe of Pakistan
 Bardia or El Burdi, a seaport in Libya
 George Burdi (born 1970), Canadian musician who initially became known for his role in White nationalist organizations
 Nick Burdi (born 1993), American professional baseball pitcher
 Zack Burdi (born 1995), American professional baseball pitcher

See also
 Burdis, a surname